Agate House is a partially reconstructed Puebloan building in Petrified Forest National Park, built almost entirely of petrified wood. The eight-room pueblo has been dated to approximately the year 900 and occupied through 1200, of the Pueblo II and Pueblo III periods.  The agatized wood was laid in a clay mortar, in lieu of the more usual sandstone-and-mortar masonry of the area.

The ruins of Agate House were reconstructed by the Civilian Conservation Corps in 1933-34 under the direction of C.B. Cosgrove Jr. of the New Mexico Laboratory of Anthropology.  Room 7 was fully reconstructed with a new roof. Room 2's walls were rebuilt to a height of five feet, but not roofed, and the remaining walls were rebuilt to a height of two or three feet.

Agate House images

See also
 
 
 National Register of Historic Places listings in Navajo County, Arizona
 National Register of Historic Places listings in Petrified Forest National Park

References

External links

 Petrified Forest National Park.gov: Agate House

National Register of Historic Places in Petrified Forest National Park
Civilian Conservation Corps in Arizona
Archaeological sites in Arizona
Archaeological sites on the National Register of Historic Places in Arizona
National Register of Historic Places in Navajo County, Arizona
Former populated places in Navajo County, Arizona
Protected areas of Navajo County, Arizona
Ancient Puebloan archaeological sites in Arizona